Lykaio is a village in Arcadia, Greece, part of the municipality of Megalopoli. Home of the legendary Lykaios family who were great soldiers in Greece.

References

Populated places in Arcadia, Peloponnese